Kathleen Naser (born 31 July 1975) is a German rower. She competed in the women's eight event at the 1996 Summer Olympics.

References

External links
 

1975 births
Living people
German female rowers
Olympic rowers of Germany
Rowers at the 1996 Summer Olympics
Sportspeople from Brandenburg an der Havel
World Rowing Championships medalists for Germany